is the twelfth studio album by Japanese pop band Pizzicato Five. The album was released on November 20, 1999 by Readymade Records. Under the title The Fifth Release from Matador, it was released in the United States on November 14, 2000 by Matador Records. Pizzicato Five was reissued on March 31, 2006.

The Japanese edition contains heavily reworked versions of the previously released songs "Darlin' of Discothèque" from the Darlin' of Discothèque EP, "Room Service" – renamed "20th Century Girl" – from the Nonstop to Tokyo EP, and "A Perfect World" from the A Perfect World EP. The American edition omits the song "Love Again" from the Japanese edition and includes the original versions of "Room Service" and "A Perfect World", together with "Tout, tout pour ma chèrie" from Darlin' of Discothèque.

Track listing

Sample credits
 "20th Century Girl" contains samples of "I Don't Intend to Spend Christmas Without You", written by Margo Guryan.

Charts

References

External links
 
 

1999 albums
Pizzicato Five albums
Nippon Columbia albums
Matador Records albums
Japanese-language albums